PDMS may refer to:
 Palm Desert Middle School, a middle school in Palm Desert, California
 Plant Design Management System
 Plasma desorption mass spectrometry
 Point-Defence Missile System
 Polydimethylsiloxane, a silicon-based organic polymer

ja:艦対空ミサイル#個艦防空ミサイル